William Harold Wheeler Jr. (born July 14, 1943), better known as Harold Wheeler, is an American orchestrator, composer, conductor, arranger, record producer, and music director. He has received numerous Tony Award and Drama Desk Award nominations for orchestration, and won the 2003 Drama Desk Award for Outstanding Orchestrations for Hairspray.

Career
Wheeler first worked in the 1960s as the musical director (MD) for Burt Bacharach making him the first African-American MD of a major pop act. He also was doing arranging for Tony Orlando and Nina Simone during that time. He was named Music Conductor for the 76th Academy Awards, becoming only the second African-American conductor in the Academy's history. He also was a music arranger on the 79th Academy Awards. Wheeler was one of two conductors (the others being fellow composers John Williams and Paul Shaffer) during the closing ceremonies of the 1996 Summer Olympics.

Wheeler was the musical director on the ABC Network show, Dancing with the Stars for the show's first 17 seasons. In January 2014, it was announced that former American Idol bandleader Ray Chew would take over as musical director for the show's 18th season.

Awards
In 2008, he received a Lifetime Achievement Award from the NAACP Theatre Awards In 2019, he received a Special Tony Award for Lifetime Achievement in the Theater.

Personal
Harold was born in St Louis, Missouri.  He attended Howard University, where he met his future wife—television, Broadway, and movie performer Hattie Winston.

Stage

 Promises, Promises (1968) – Musical Director, dance arrangements
 Coco (1969) – Dance arrangements
 Ain't Supposed to Die a Natural Death (1971) – Musical direction and supervision
 Two Gentlemen of Verona (1971) – Musical Supervisor
 Don't Play Us Cheap! (1972) – Musical Supervisor
 Love For Love (1974) – featuring songs by
 The Wiz (1975) – music orchestrated by
 Lena Horne: The Lady and Her Music (1981) – Musical Director
 Dreamgirls (1981) – Musical Supervisor, music orchestrated by
 Little Me (1982) – music orchestrated by
 The Tap Dance Kid (1983) – Musical Supervisor, music arranged by, vocal arrangements by
 The Wiz (1984) – music orchestrated by
 The Three Musketeers (1984) – additional orchestrations by
 Leader of the Pack (1985) – opening dance sequence composed and orchestrated by
 Grind (1985) – additional orchestrations by
 Dreamgirls (1987) – Musical Supervisor, music orchestrated by
 Carrie (1988) – Musical Supervisor, music orchestrated by
 Tommy Tune Tonite! (1992) – arrangements and/or orchestrations by
 The Life (1997) – music orchestrated by
 Side Show (1997) – music orchestrated by
 Little Me (1998) – music orchestrated by
 Swing! (1999) – music orchestrated by
 The Full Monty (2000) – music orchestrated by
 Hairspray (2002) – music orchestrated by
 Never Gonna Dance (2003) – music orchestrated by
 Dirty Rotten Scoundrels (2005) – music orchestrated by
 Lennon (2005) – music orchestrated by
 Hugh Jackman: Back on Broadway (2011) – arrangements and orchestrations by
 Side Show (2014) – music orchestrated by
 Ain't Too Proud (2019) – music orchestrated by

Partial discography
 Nina Simone – Here Comes the Sun (1971) – Arranger, conductor & producer
 Bruce Springsteen – Greetings From Asbury Park, N.J. (1973) – Piano on "Blinded By the Light" and "Spirit In The Night"
 Grind (1985) – Additional orchestrations
 The Harold Wheeler Consort – Black Cream (1975) RCA BGL1-0849 – Producer, arranger, piano/keyboards/organ/Moog, composer credit for tracks "Black Cream" and "Color Me Soul" 
  Meco – Star Wars and Other Galactic Funk (1977) – arranger & producer
 The Wiz (1978) – soundtrack
 Straight Out of Brooklyn (1991) – original music
 Mississippi Rising (2005) – Arranger and conductor

As sideman
With Bernard Purdie
Purdie Good! (Prestige, 1971)
Stand by Me (Whatcha See Is Whatcha Get) (Mega, 1971)

References

External links

thehistorymakers.com/biography
All Music Guide
Harold Wheeler Interview NAMM Oral History Library (2021)

1943 births
Living people
African-American conductors (music)
American male conductors (music)
American male composers
21st-century American composers
Record producers from Missouri
American music arrangers
Musicians from St. Louis
Classical musicians from Missouri
Special Tony Award recipients
21st-century American conductors (music)
21st-century American male musicians
21st-century African-American musicians
20th-century African-American people